The Wages of Sin is a 1918 British silent drama film directed by Arrigo Bocchi and starring Kenelm Foss, Mary Odette and Hayford Hobbs. It is based on the 1891 novel of the same name by Lucas Malet.

Cast
 Kenelm Foss as Colthurst  
 Mary Odette as Mary Crookenden  
 Mary Marsh Allen as Jenny Parris  
 Hayford Hobbs as Lance Crookenden 
 Charles Vane as Cyprian Aldham 
 Edward O'Neill as Bill Parris  
 Bert Wynne as Steve Kingdom  
 Arthur Walcott as Isaacstein  
 Judd Green as Wilmot 
 Harry Lofting as Captain Prust

References

Bibliography
 Goble, Alan. The Complete Index to Literary Sources in Film. Walter de Gruyter, 1999.

External links

1918 films
1918 drama films
British silent feature films
British drama films
1910s English-language films
Films directed by Arrigo Bocchi
Films set in England
British black-and-white films
Films based on British novels
Silent drama films
1910s British films